The Duple 300 Series were a range of bus and coach bodywork built by Duple between 1985 and 1989. The 320 and 340 coaches were announced at the Bus and Coach Show at Earls Court in September 1985 as replacements for the previous Laser and Caribbean. Deliveries of these models commenced in 1986, whilst the 300 bus was launched in 1987 as a replacement for the Dominant Bus. After Duple closed down the designs were sold to Plaxton and a small number of additional 320 bodies were built as the Plaxton 321.

Variants

Duple 320
When it was launched the 320 was available on 11-metre long Bedford YNT and Leyland Tiger chassis and 12m long Bedford YNV, Leyland Tiger, DAF MB200 / MB230 and Volvo B10M chassis.  Subsequently, a few old 11 and 12 m Leyland Leopard chassis received replacement Duple 320 bodies, and a batch of 12m 320s was built on rear-engined Scania K93 chassis in 1988.  However, the most popular chassis for the 320 would prove to be the Dennis Javelin.  At the time of its launch in 1986 both Dennis and Duple were under common ownership by the Hestair Group so the Duple 320 body was the obvious choice for Javelin prototypes. After series production began in 1988 the Javelin/320 combination accounted for about one third of Duple's coach output.  In addition to the standard 11- and 12-metre versions, the Dennis Javelin was also available as an 8.5 m midicoach.

Duple 340
The taller Duple 340 was intended to be more upmarket than the 320 and was only available on 12-metre long heavyweight chassis.  Initially these were the mid-engined DAF MB200 / MB230, Leyland Tiger and Volvo B10M and the rear-engined DAF SB2305, but the Scania K93 also became available in 1988.  The 320 and 340 shared similar front ends and windscreens, but the 340 could be distinguished by its greater height, with the side windows being stepped up slightly behind the door/cab window and a curved front roof dome over the cab.

Duple 300
Although primarily a coach manufacturer, Duple also manufactured bus bodies on a limited scale.  The 300 was introduced two years after the coach versions of the series and was available on 11 m Dennis Javelin, Leyland Tiger and Volvo B10M chassis, selling in small quantities only.  The largest customer was Hutchison's Coaches of Overtown, Lanarkshire, which purchased 15 Volvos.  The 300 had little visual similarity to the coach models apart from the use of similar front grille/headlamps and rear window.

Plaxton 321
Duple had struggled with a declining market share throughout the 1980s and the business was closed down at the end of the 1989 season.  The rights to manufacture the 300 series bodies and the Duple 425 integral were purchased by Plaxton, which planned to restart production of the former Duple range at its own Scarborough factory and its French subsidiary Carrosserie Lorraine.  In the event these plans were thwarted by declining economic conditions which limited the demand for new coaches.  Indeed, the last Dennis Javelin/Duple 320 built for dealer stock was not registered until 1993 (K326ANC).  Production of the 300 and 340 did not resume, but Plaxton did re-engineer the 320 to include standard Plaxton parts, in which form it could be sold at a lower price than the equivalent Plaxton Paramount 3200 III.  A single batch of 25 12-metre Leyland Tigers was bodied at Scarborough in 1991 and sold through the Kirkby coach dealership as the Plaxton 321, but no further examples were built.

Gallery

See also

Plaxton Derwent 3000
Plaxton Paramount
List of buses

References

Buses of the United Kingdom
Intercity buses
Single-deck buses
Vehicles introduced in 1985